Diego Chitzoff (born 4 April 1980 in Gobernador Galvez, Santa Fe) is an Argentine football right back currently playing for Tiro Federal.

Chitzoff started his career in 2002 playing for Tiro Federal in the Argentine 3rd division. In 2003 the club won the Cluasura tournament and promotion to Primera B Nacional.

Chitzoff signed for Colón in 2004 and went on to make over 100 appearances for the club. On 24 July 2009 he signed for Rosario Central, the club he is fan of.

Career statistics

Titles

References

External links
  Argentine Primera statistics

1980 births
Living people
People from Rosario Department
Argentine footballers
Association football defenders
Tiro Federal footballers
Club Atlético Colón footballers
Rosario Central footballers
Gimnasia y Esgrima de Jujuy footballers
Talleres de Córdoba footballers
Argentine Primera División players
Primera Nacional players
Sportspeople from Santa Fe Province